U937 may refer to:
 U937 (cell line), a human cell line
 a ship of the Ukrainian Navy